Maria Ryabushkina, also known as Melena Maria Rya is a Russian artist, actress, nude fashion model and Cover Girl

Overview 
Maria was born in Russia and started her career as a model in Russia. She works as a cover model for magazines and adult websites. Maria owns an online store that includes lingerie, bikinis, and footwear. She was also featured on the cover of Maxim Mexico and the Maxim Czech Republic.

In November 2019, iStripper has named Maria as its “Talent of the Month”.

Maria worked for Playboy Plus in 2018, and with her real name Maria Ryabushkina on a new issue in May 2019, called “All Eyes On Me”.

Maria was also featured in:

 Maxim Magazine (she was Cover girl on the Czech edition of May 2015) Special Hockey Issue.
 Union Magazine (France, July 2015)
 Penthouse Magazine (Pet Of the Day, August 2015-September 2015).
 Maxim Mexico April 2021
 Playboy Africa October 2021
 FHM INDIA October 2021

References

External links 
 
 
 
 

Living people
Russian female adult models
1990 births